Crispus Walter Kiyonga (born 1 January 1952), whose first name is sometimes spelled Chrispus, is a Ugandan physician, politician and diplomat, who serves as Uganda's Ambassador to China, based in Beijing. He previously served as the Minister of Defence in the Cabinet of Uganda from 2006 to 2016.

Prior to that, he was Minister Without Portfolio in the Office of the President from 2005 to 2006. During the cabinet reshuffle of 16 February 2009,
and that of 27 May 2011, and that of 1 March 2015, he retained his cabinet post. In 2016, he lost the Member of Parliament (MP) seat for Bukonjo County West to Hon. Robert Katusabe, Kasese District, in the Ugandan Parliament.

Background and education
Kiyonga was born in Kasese District in the Western Region of Uganda on 1 January 1952. Between 1959 and 1966, he attended Bwera Primary School, in Bwera, a few kilometres from the Ugandan border with the Democratic Republic of the Congo. During 1967 through 1970, he attended Nyakasura School from S1 to S4. He studied for his S5 and S6 at Kings College Budo from 1971 to 1972.

From 1973 through 1978, he attended Makerere University School of Medicine where he obtained his first medical degree, the Bachelor of Medicine and Bachelor of Surgery (MBChB) in 1978. Later, in 2004, he obtained a Master of Health Science (MHS) with specialisation in Population Dynamics from the Johns Hopkins School of Public Health. His studies at Johns Hopkins were funded through a Fogarty International Center Scholarship.

Career
During the first post-Idi Amin national elections in Uganda in 1980, Kiyonga participated as a candidate on the Uganda Patriotic Movement (UPM) platform. He won in his constituency, making him the only UPM candidate who won during those elections. He joined the National Resistance Movement (NRM) during its struggle against the second Milton Obote regime from 1981 until 1986.

From 1986, when the NRM assumed power in Uganda, until 2006 when he was appointed as Minister of Defense, Crispus Kiyonga held several cabinet and non-cabinet posts in the Ugandan Government:

 1986 - 1986: Minister for Cooperatives & Marketing
 1986 - 1992: Minister of Finance - Credited with the establishment of Uganda Revenue Authority.
 1994 - 1996: Minister of Internal Affairs
 1996 - 2001: Minister of Health - Credited with efficient handling of Ebola outbreak in Gulu in 2000. Chairman Global Fund.
 2001 - 2006: Minister without Portfolio in the Office of the President and National Political Commissar.
 2006 - 2016: Minister of Defense

Between 1992 and 1994, Kiyonga left the government temporarily to serve as a consultant with the World Bank and the African Development Bank. He returned to active politics in 1994 when he was elected to the Constituent Assembly that drew up the 1995 Uganda Constitution. He continuously represented Bukonjo County West, in the Ugandan Parliament, from 1980 until 2016. In 2016, he was appointed Uganda's Ambassador to China.

See also
Cabinet of Uganda
Parliament of Uganda
Kasese District

References

External links

 Website of the Parliament of Uganda

1952 births
Living people
People from Kasese District
Uganda Patriotic Movement politicians
Ugandan diplomats
National Resistance Movement politicians
Finance Ministers of Uganda
Government ministers of Uganda
Johns Hopkins University alumni
Makerere University alumni
Members of the Parliament of Uganda
Ugandan public health doctors
People from Western Region, Uganda
21st-century Ugandan politicians